Magdalena Kwaśna (born 31 March 1998) is a Polish competitive sailor.

She competed at the 2020 Summer Olympics in Tokyo 2021, in Laser Radial.

References

External links
 
 
 

 

1998 births
Living people
Polish female sailors (sport)
Olympic sailors of Poland
Sailors at the 2020 Summer Olympics – Laser Radial
People from Chojnice